The following lists events that happened during 1916 in Australia.

Incumbents

Monarch – George V
Governor-General – The Right Hon. Sir Ronald Munro-Ferguson
Prime Minister – Billy Hughes
Chief Justice – Samuel Griffith

State premiers
Premier of New South Wales – William Holman
Premier of Queensland – T. J. Ryan
Premier of South Australia – Crawford Vaughan
Premier of Tasmania – John Earle (until 15 April), then Walter Lee
Premier of Western Australia – John Scaddan (until 27 July), then Frank Wilson
Premier of Victoria – Sir Alexander Peacock

State governors
Governor of New South Wales – Sir Gerald Strickland
Governor of Queensland – Major Sir Hamilton Goold-Adams
Governor of South Australia – Lieutenant Colonel Sir Henry Galway
Governor of Tasmania – Sir William Ellison-Macartney
Governor of Western Australia – Major-General Sir Harry Barron
Governor of Victoria – Sir Arthur Stanley

Events
 Hotels are forced to close at 6 p.m., leading to the beginning of the "six o'clock swill": 27 March in South Australia; 21 July in Sydney after referendum of 10 June; 11 October in Victoria; during March in Tasmania.
14 February – Liverpool riot of 1916 – troops mutinied against conditions at the Casula Camp.  They raided hotels in Liverpool before travelling by train to Sydney, where one soldier was shot dead in a riot at Central Railway station.
6 June – The Returned Sailors' and Soldiers' Imperial League of Australia, the forerunner to the Returned and Services League is founded.
26 June – William Jackson awarded the Victoria Cross for his actions in a raid near Armentières, France.
1 to 30 June – Adelaide receives  of rain, its highest monthly rainfall since records began in 1839.
19 July – Battle of Fromelles commenced; over the next seven weeks 22 826 Australian casualties occurred.
23 July – Arthur Seaforth Blackburn and John Leak awarded the Victoria Cross for their actions (separate) at the Battle of Pozières.
25 July – Thomas Cooke died in the Battle of Pozières and was awarded the Victoria Cross for his gallantry in the face of the enemy.
29 July – Claude Charles Castleton killed in the Battle of Pozières and for his actions in bringing back wounded men before and at the time of his death, he was awarded the Victoria Cross.
Between 9 August and 12 August – Martin O'Meara repeatedly went out and brought in wounded officers and men from "No Man's Land" under intense artillery and machine-gun fire during the Battle of Pozières; for his gallantry he was awarded the Victoria Cross.
30 August – Rescue of the 22 men Imperial Trans-Antarctic Expedition who remained on Elephant Island.
28 October – The first plebiscite on the issue of military conscription was held; it was defeated.
1 November – a general coal strike began in eastern Australia.
The Labor government under Billy Hughes splits over military conscription.
 13 November – Prime Minister of Australia Billy Hughes is expelled from the Labor Party over his support for conscription.
2 December – Sydney Twelve: 12 members of the Industrial Workers of the World (IWW or the Wobblies) convicted in Sydney of conspiring to commit arson and sedition.
 23 December – World War I: Battle of Magdhaba – In the Sinai desert, Australian and New Zealand mounted troops capture the Turkish garrison.
28 December – floods in Clermont, Queensland claimed more than 60 lives.

Arts and literature

 6 March – The Sydney conservatorium of music accepts first students.

Sport
 Sasanof wins the Melbourne Cup
 The Sheffield Shield was not contested due to the war.
 26 July – The 1916 NSWRFL season culminates in a grand final victory to Balmain, who defeated South Sydney 5–3.

Births

 28 February – Frank Crean, 5th Deputy Prime Minister of Australia (d. 2008)
 14 April – Don Willesee, Western Australian politician (d. 2003)
 11 July – Gough Whitlam, 21st Prime Minister of Australia (d. 2014)
 29 July – Sir Rupert Hamer, 39th Premier of Victoria (d. 2004)
 27 August – Sir James Ramsay, 20th Governor of Queensland (d. 1986)
 11 September – Warren Bonython, conservationist and chemical engineer (d. 2012)
 14 September – John Heyer, documentary filmmaker (d. 2001)
 25 September – Jessica Anderson, novelist (d. 2010)

Deaths
 19 May – William Sawers, New South Wales politician (born in the United Kingdom) (b. 1844)
 13 August – Sir George Turner, 18th Premier of Victoria (b. 1851)
 7 November – Henry Brockman, Western Australian politician (b. 1845)

See also
 List of Australian films of the 1910s

References

 
Australia
Years of the 20th century in Australia